Mark Philippoussis was the defending champion but lost in the second round to Juan Balcells.

Greg Rusedski won in the final 6–3, 6–4 against Andre Agassi.

Seeds
A champion seed is indicated in bold text while text in italics indicates the round in which that seed was eliminated.

  Andre Agassi (final)
  Lleyton Hewitt (quarterfinals)
  Mark Philippoussis (second round)
  Tommy Haas (quarterfinals)
  Sjeng Schalken (first round)
  Jan-Michael Gambill (semifinals)
 n/a
  Greg Rusedski (champion)

Draw

External links
 2001 Sybase Open Draw

SAP Open
2001 ATP Tour